The thirty-seventh season of Saturday Night Live, an American sketch comedy series, originally aired in the United States on NBC between September 24, 2011, and May 19, 2012.

Cast
The season began with minimal changes to the cast, as everyone from the prior year returned. The only major change was Nasim Pedrad being upgraded to repertory status.

Vanessa Bayer, Paul Brittain, Taran Killam, and Jay Pharoah all remained as featured players. Brittain, who had joined the show for Season 36 alongside Bayer, Killam, and Pharoah, exited abruptly halfway through this season, making his final appearance on January 14, 2012. Following Brittain's departure, comedian and writer Kate McKinnon, previously a cast member on The Big Gay Sketch Show, joined the cast mid-season, as a featured player for the last five episodes of the season, making her debut on April 7, 2012, following a March 28, 2012, report of her being hired. McKinnon is SNL's first openly gay cast member hired since Terry Sweeney in 1985, and the show's first openly gay female cast member (Denny Dillon from the 1980–81 season was SNL's first lesbian cast member but Dillon's sexuality was not public knowledge until much later).

This was the final season for longtime cast members Kristen Wiig and Andy Samberg, both cast members since 2005, as well as for Abby Elliott, who had been a cast member since 2008. Elliott was let go from the show following the finale, while Wiig and Samberg both left on their own terms.

Cast roster

Repertory players
Fred Armisen
Abby Elliott
Bill Hader
Seth Meyers
Bobby Moynihan
Nasim Pedrad
Andy Samberg
Jason Sudeikis
Kenan Thompson
Kristen Wiig

Featured players
Vanessa Bayer
Paul Brittain (final episode: January 14, 2012)
Taran Killam
Kate McKinnon (first episode: April 7, 2012)
Jay Pharoah

bold denotes Weekend Update anchor

Writers

This season saw several new writers. CollegeHumor writer Sarah Schneider was added to the writing staff, after serving as a guest writer for the last five episodes of season 36. Also added were Chris Kelly, who previously wrote for Funny or Die and The Onion News Network; Zach Kanin, who worked on the Harvard Lampoon; and Peter Schultz, a performer from the Upright Citizens Brigade Theater. This was also the last season for writer John Mulaney who had been there since 2008. 

The season saw the deaths of three former SNL writers. Nelson Lyon died at the age of 73 due to liver cancer; Lyon wrote for the show during its seventh season. Mark O'Donnell, who also wrote during the show's seventh season, died of a heart attack at the age of 58 outside his apartment in New York. Tom Davis, who was one of the original SNL writers and appeared in multiple sketches over the years died after a three-year battle with throat and neck cancer.

Episodes

References

37
Saturday Night Live in the 2010s
2011 American television seasons
2012 American television seasons
Television shows directed by Don Roy King